The Daughters of the Divine Redeemer are a congregation of Roman Catholic nuns, with a motherhouse at Ödenburg, Hungary; they were founded in 1863 from the Daughters of the Divine Saviour of Vienna.

References

Attribution

Religious organizations established in 1863
Catholic female orders and societies
Catholic religious institutes established in the 19th century
1863 establishments in the Austrian Empire
Hungarian Roman Catholic religious sisters and nuns